Hanna Sofia Margareta Arkelsten (born 6 December 1976 in Stockholm) is a Swedish politician of the Moderate Party. She served as member of the Swedish Riksdag from 2006 to 2018, representing her home constituency of Stockholm Municipality.

Arkelsten served as Secretary of the Moderate Party from 2010 to 2012 and Chairman of the Committee on Foreign Affairs from 2012 to 2014.

Career

Early career
Arkelsten previously worked on Svensk Handel and on ICA Sweden as director of communications.

She was previously active in municipal politics in Stockholm, including the Environment and Health Committee, Maria-Gamla Stan District and the City Council. Between 1998-1999 she was the Chairman of student organization Free Conservative Lawyers.

Party Secretary
On 1 October 2010 she replaced Per Schlingmann as party-Secretary of the Moderate Party. On 20 April 2012 she resigned of her own accord.

Personal life 
Sofia Arkelsten was born in Stockholm. In April 2011 she married Olof Torvestig and she is an outspoken vegetarian. Her first child, a daughter, was born on 25 November 2012. On 16 October 2014, Arkelsten made public that she was diagnosed with chronic disease multiple sclerosis (MS).

References

External links 
 Sofia Arkelsten at the Riksdag website

Members of the Riksdag from the Moderate Party
Living people
1976 births
Women members of the Riksdag
21st-century Swedish women politicians